Nicholas 'Nick' Taylor Swetman (born 27 September 1984) is a Welsh cricketer.  Swetman is a right-handed batsman who bowls right-arm fast-medium.  He was born in Penarth, Glamorgan.

Swetman made his debut for Wales Minor Counties in the 2002 MCCA Knockout Trophy against the Gloucestershire Cricket Board.  From 2002 to 2004, he represented the team in 4 Trophy matches, the last of which came against Berkshire.  His Minor Counties Championship debut came in 2003 against Cheshire.  From 2003 to 2004, he represented the team in 7 Championship matches, the last of which came against Oxfordshire.  His only List A appearance for the team came in the 2nd round of the 2004 Cheltenham & Gloucester Trophy against Middlesex.  In the match he scored 4 runs and took a single wicket for the cost of 41 runs from 10 overs.

He previously played a number of Second XI matches for the Glamorgan Second XI from 2002 to 2004.

References

External links
Nick Swetman at Cricinfo
Nick Swetman at CricketArchive

1984 births
Living people
Cricketers from Penarth
Welsh cricketers
Wales National County cricketers